Meharban Singh is an Indian pediatrician, neonatologist and medical writer, who has published more than 10 books on child care. He was WHO consultant on Newborn Care in South-East Asia for longtime. He has served for more than 3 decades in All India Institute of Medical Sciences, New Delhi. He was president of the Indian Academy of Pediatrics in 1993.

Positions held

 Professor and Head, Department of Pediatrics and Neonatology Division, All India Institute of Medical Sciences, New Delhi. 
 Established the first WHO Collaborating Centre for Training and Research in Newborn Care in South-East Asia region at All India Institute of Medical Sciences, New Delhi. 
 WHO consultant and MCH Advisor to several developing countries.
 Director, Indira Gandhi Institute of Child Health, Kabul, Afghanistan during 1979–83. 
 Visiting Professor of Pediatrics to several countries including Afghanistan, Iran, Nepal, Saudi Arabia, Libya, Kuwait, UAE, Sri Lanka, Malaysia, Bangladesh, Republic of Maldives, UK, and USA.
 Secretary-General and President of the National Neonatology Forum of India and President of the Indian Academy of Pediatrics. 
 Currently working as a consultant Pediatrician at Child Care Centre, Noida, Delhi.

Medical writer
He is a medical writer and teacher who has published 10 books on various aspects of Pediatrics and Neonatology, 40 chapters in Pediatric textbooks, 5 Monographs on various aspects of Neonatology, and over 325 research papers, reviews and editorials in National and International Medical Journals.

Books authored
 A Manual of Essential Pediatrics (Second edition, 2013), Theme medical and scientific publishers, Noida,.
 Care of the Newborn (Revised eighth edition, 2017), CBS publishers and distributors, New Delhi
 Drug Dosages in Children (along with Ashok K. Deorari, Tenth edition, 2019) CBS publishers and distributors, New Delhi
 Essential Pediatrics for Nurses (Third edition, 2014), CBS publishers and distributors,
 Medical Emergencies in Children (Fifth edition, 2018), CBS publishers and distributors,
 Medical Quotations (2009), Sagar publications, New Delhi
 Pearls of Wisdom and Art of Living (2009), Sagar publications, New Delhi.
 Pediatric Clinical Methods (Fourth edition, 2011), Sagar publications, New Delhi.
 The art and science of baby & child care : a complete book on parenting.

References

Academic staff of the All India Institute of Medical Sciences, New Delhi
Medical writers
Indian neonatologists
1937 births
Living people